Wilfred Bert Bonde (born 3 October 1934) is a former Australian politician. Born in Ulverstone, Tasmania, he was elected to the Tasmanian House of Assembly in 1986 as a Liberal member for Braddon. He was a minister from 1996 to 1998. Bonde retired in 2002.

References

1934 births
Living people
Liberal Party of Australia members of the Parliament of Tasmania
Members of the Tasmanian House of Assembly
21st-century Australian politicians